John Aeron Thomas (24 November 1850 – 1 February 1935), was a British Liberal Party politician and industrialist.

Background
He was the son of Lewis Thomas, of Panteryrod, Cardiganshire. He was educated at Rhydowen and at Milford grammar school. He married in 1880, Eleanor Lewis of Nantgwynne, Carmarthenshire.  They had two sons and one daughter.

Career
He became a Solicitor in 1874 working for Aeron Thomas and co. of Swansea. He was also a colliery proprietor and tin-plate manufacturer. He was and Alderman of Swansea Council and Mayor of Swansea from 1897 to 1898, a Justice of the Peace and a Member of Swansea Harbour Trust. He sat as Liberal MP for the Gower from 1900 to 1906;

He retired at the General Election of January 1906. He did not stand for parliament again.

Sources
Who Was Who
British parliamentary election results 1885–1918, Craig, F. W. S.

References

External links 
Who Was Who; http://www.ukwhoswho.com

1850 births
1935 deaths
Liberal Party (UK) MPs for Welsh constituencies
UK MPs 1900–1906
Mayors of Swansea